Leonardo Agustín Sánchez (born 2 August 1986) is an Argentinean footballer who plays as a defender.

References

External links
 

1986 births
Living people
Argentine footballers
Argentine expatriate footballers
Association football defenders
Swiss Super League players
Estudiantes de La Plata footballers
San Martín de San Juan footballers
Argentinos Juniors footballers
Chacarita Juniors footballers
Instituto footballers
Unión de Santa Fe footballers
FC Zürich players
Aldosivi footballers
Argentine expatriate sportspeople in Switzerland
Expatriate footballers in Switzerland
Footballers from La Plata